Skogerøya is an uninhabited island in Sør-Varanger municipality in Troms og Finnmark county, Norway. The  partially forested island lies south of the Varangerfjorden, west of the Bøkfjorden, north of the Korsfjorden, and east of the Kjøfjorden. It is used as a summer and autumn grazing area for reindeer.

See also
List of islands of Norway

References

Islands of Troms og Finnmark
Sør-Varanger
Uninhabited islands of Norway